In mathematics, especially in the study of dynamical systems,  a limit set is the state a dynamical system reaches after an infinite amount of time has passed, by either going forward or backwards in time. Limit sets are important because they can be used to understand the long term behavior of a dynamical system. A system that has reached its limiting set is said to be at equilibrium.

Types 
 fixed points
 periodic orbits
 limit cycles
 attractors

In general, limits sets can be very complicated as in the case of strange attractors, but for 2-dimensional dynamical systems the Poincaré–Bendixson theorem provides a simple characterization of all nonempty, compact -limit sets that contain at most finitely many fixed points as a fixed point, a periodic orbit, or a union of fixed points and homoclinic or heteroclinic orbits connecting those fixed points.

Definition for iterated functions
Let  be a metric space, and let   be a continuous function. Another way to express this is

where  denotes the closure of set . The points in the limit set are non-wandering (but may not be recurrent points). This may also be formulated as the outer limit (limsup) of a sequence of sets, such that 

If  is a homeomorphism (that is, a bicontinuous bijection), then the -limit set is defined in a similar fashion, but for the backward orbit; i.e. . 

Both sets are -invariant, and if  is compact, they are compact and nonempty.

Definition for flows
Given a real dynamical system (T, X, φ) with flow , a point x, we call a point y an ω-limit point of x if there exists a sequence  in  so that

.

For an orbit γ of (T, X, φ), we say that y is an ω-limit point of γ, if it is an ω-limit point of some point on the orbit.  

Analogously we call y an α-limit point of x if there exists a sequence  in  so that

.

For an orbit γ of (T, X, φ), we say that y is an α-limit point of γ, if it is an α-limit point of some point on the orbit.  

The set of all ω-limit points (α-limit points) for a given orbit γ is called  ω-limit set (α-limit set) for γ and denoted limω γ (limα γ).

If the ω-limit set (α-limit set) is disjoint from the orbit γ, that is limω γ ∩ γ = ∅ (limα γ ∩ γ = ∅), we call limω γ (limα γ) a ω-limit cycle (α-limit cycle). 

Alternatively the limit sets can be defined as

and

Examples 
 For any periodic orbit γ of a dynamical system, limω γ = limα γ = γ
 For any fixed point  of a dynamical system, limω  = limα  =

Properties 
 limω γ and limα γ are closed
 if X is compact then limω γ and limα γ are nonempty, compact and connected
 limω γ and limα γ are φ-invariant, that is φ( × limω γ) = limω γ and φ( × limα γ) = limα γ

See also
 Julia set
 Stable set
 Limit cycle
 Periodic point
 Non-wandering set
 Kleinian group

References

Further reading